Electricidad (English: Electricity) is the second studio album by Mexican duo Jesse & Joy. The album was released on 15 September 2009, by Warner Music México, and reached number twenty-one on the Mexican Albums Chart. The album was certified Gold by the Asociación Mexicana de Productores de Fonogramas y Videogramas (AMPROFON). "Adiós" became the album's lead single in July 2009. It peaked at number thirteen at the Hot Latin Songs chart and number three at Latin Pop Airplay chart. The title track was released the next month, and "Chocolate" was released as the third single. It peaked at number thirteen at the Mexican Airplay chart, as well as twenty-nine at the Latin Pop Airplay chart. "Si Te Vas" was released as the fourth and last single. Jesse & Joy promoted the album on a concert tour.

Background
In an interview with Univision, Jesse commented "We're happy with how the album turned out, we're very satisfied with it, we've been experimenting for about eighteen months with sounds and everything and now here in the last five months we managed to assemble those parts in Los Angeles and from that came the single 'Adiós'".

Track listing
All songs were written by Jesse & Joy.

Electricidad Tour
To promote the album, Jesse & Joy began the tour with a concert in the city of Houston, Texas on 25 September, also New York City's Webster Hall, along with Kinky on 30 September. Along with these dates, the tour has dates on Mexico, United States, Spain, Central America and South America.

Credits and personnel
Credits adapted from Electricidad liner notes.

Stevie Blacke – recording, string instruments
Jon Button – bass guitar
Randy Cooke – drums, percussion
Matt Duane Griffin – production coordinator
Jesse Huerta – composer, background vocals, guitar, bass guitar, piano
Joy Huerta – composer, lead vocals
Gavin Lurssen – mastering engineer

Albert Mata – mastering engineer assistant
Fernando Roldán – recording
Thom Russo – arranger, hammond B3, keyboards, mix engineer, percussion, piano, producer, programming, recording, music director
Maggie Wheeler – music director

Charts

Album
The album debuted on the Mexican Albums Chart at number 55, and reached number 21 as its peak position.

Singles

Year-end charts

Certifications

References

2009 albums
Jesse & Joy albums
Spanish-language albums
Warner Music Group albums